Shangluo is a prefecture-level city in southeastern Shaanxi province, People's Republic of China, bordering Henan to the northeast and Hubei to the southeast. Part of the Shannan region of the province, it is located in the eastern part of the Qin Mountains (Qin Ling).

Climate
As with the other two anchoring cities of Shannan, Shangluo has a monsoon-influenced humid subtropical climate (Köppen Cwa), with cool winters, hot, humid summers, and ample precipitation by provincial standards. It experiences temperatures more moderate than Xi'an and the rest of the Wei River valley to the immediate north, especially so during summer due to the high elevation. The frost-free period lasts 200 days, and there are about 2,000 hours of bright sunshine annually.

Administration

Transport 
China National Highway 312

Demographics

Sister cities
Emmen, Netherlands
Jinan County, South Korea

References

External links

 
Cities in Shaanxi